XHPEDX-FM is a radio station on 96.9 FM in Linares, Nuevo León. The station is owned by Delia Rodríguez Arreola, a pastor of the Iglesia Castillo del Rey church, which programs a Christian format named Radio La Siembra.

History
Rodríguez Arreola filed for a social station in Linares in March 2014. The concession was awarded on May 22, 2018.

References

Radio stations in Nuevo León
Christian radio stations in Mexico